Stepan Betsa was a Soviet and Ukrainian midfielder. He is a Master of Sports (1991) and tragically perished in a car accident.

Biography
Stepan Betsa was born in Mukachevo, but he started his first steps in his football career in Dnipropetrovsk. Until his 18 Betsa played for a junior squad of Dnipro Dnipropetrovsk winning a tournament for junior squads in 1987. After he was not able to make to the main squad, Betsa left for the second league team FC Shakhtar Horlivka and after a half of season moved to the first league Tavriya Simferopol. During that season Betsa played over 30 games scoring for both clubs. In 1989, he moved again back to the continental Ukraine signing with the first league participant Metalurh Zaporizhia. In Zaporizhia he was noticed by the Dynamo Kyiv scouts and upon completion of a successful season signed with the best club of the Ukrainian football.

His first season in Dynamo in 1990 Betsa spent in a junior squad winning a champion title with it as well. Since 1991 Betsa became a key player of the club earning the most caps in the last Soviet championship. After the start of the independent Ukrainian championship Betsa status in the club has not changed and he participated in the final game of 1992 in Lviv. His career, however, was suddenly cut short after a car accident.

Car crash
On December 21, 1992 the car accident took lives of two young Ukrainian footballers at once: Stepan Betsa (Dynamo Kyiv) and Oleksiy Sasko (Dnipro Dnipropetrovsk). As the first half of the Ukrainian championship ended the players took vacations and Stepan decided to visit Dnipropetrovsk. As later Volodymyr Sharan pointed out in his interview, they (him, Betsa and Sasko) left Kyiv in two cars, but Sharan turned to Kryvyi Rih, while Betsa and Sasko continued on to Dnipropetrovsk. After some time Sharan received a call from Betsa's wife that Stepan is in the emergency room (Sasko died at the crash site). After three days in a hospital Stepan Betsa died. According to a police report, the crash happened as a car that was moving  crossed an icy portion of a road and a driver lost control of the vehicle. The auto ran right into a tree.

Awards
Dynamo Kyiv
Master of Sports
1992 League runner up

References

External links

Is there a "lunar day"?

Profile at allplayers.in.ua

1970 births
1992 deaths
People from Mukachevo
Association football midfielders
Road incident deaths in Ukraine
Soviet footballers
Ukrainian footballers
Ukrainian Premier League players
FC Dynamo Kyiv players
FC Metalurh Zaporizhzhia players
SC Tavriya Simferopol players
FC Shakhtar Horlivka players
Sportspeople from Zakarpattia Oblast